Freiberg's blind snake (Epictia australis) is a species of snake in the family Leptotyphlopidae.

References

Epictia
Reptiles described in 1968